Malminkartano (Malmgård in Swedish) is a suburb and a quarter in the western part of Helsinki city, part of the Kaarela neighbourhood. Vantaankosken rata, the railway of Vantaankoski, has a station in Malminkartano. The suburb's artificial hill, Malminkartanonhuippu or Malminkartanon täyttömäki is the highest point of Helsinki. Malminkartano is often called Maltsu by young people.

Gallery

References

External links 

Quarters of Helsinki